The 1976 Benson & Hedges Ireland Tournament was the second edition of the professional invitational snooker tournament and took place on 21 February 1976. While the previous edition was a challenge match between John Spencer and Alex Higgins, this year the tournament was expanded to four professional players, with Graham Miles and Dennis Taylor also participating. The prize fund was £1,300, with £600 going to the winner and £300 to the runner-up.

John Spencer won the title, defeating Alex Higgins 5–0 in the final. Dennis Taylor had the highest break of 115 which earned him an extra £100 in addition to his £100 prize for finishing fourth. Graham Miles earned £200 in prize money.

Main draw

Third-place match
 Graham Miles 4–1 Dennis Taylor

References

Irish Masters
Irish Masters
Irish Masters
Irish Masters